Tatau Island is an island of the Tabar Group of Papua New Guinea, located to the east of New Ireland and about a mile south of Simberi Island.

References

Islands of Papua New Guinea